7655 Adamries, provisional designation , is a Nysa asteroid from the inner regions of the asteroid belt, approximately 4 kilometers in diameter. It was discovered on 28 December 1991, by German astronomer Freimut Börngen at Karl Schwarzschild Observatory in Tautenburg, eastern Germany. It was named after mathematician Adam Ries.

Classification and orbit 

Adamries is a member of the Nysa family, one of the prominent families of the inner main-belt, named after its namesake 44 Nysa. It orbits the Sun at a distance of 2.1–2.7 AU once every 3 years and 9 months (1,373 days). Its orbit has an eccentricity of 0.14 and an inclination of 4° with respect to the ecliptic.

Physical characteristics 

Adamries has been characterized as a carbonaceous C-type asteroid by Pan-STARRS photometric survey. It is also an assumed stony S-type asteroid.

Lightcurve 

In September 2013, rotational lightcurve of Adamries was obtained from photometric observation by astronomers at the Palomar Transient Factory in California. It showed a longer-than-average rotation period of  hours with a brightness variation of 0.33 magnitude.

Diameter and albedo 

According to the survey carried out by NASA's space-based Wide-field Infrared Survey Explorer with its subsequent NEOWISE mission, Adamries measures 4.2 kilometers in diameter and its surface has an albedo of 0.25, which is typical for stony asteroids. CALL assumes a standard albedo for stony asteroids of 0.21 and calculates a diameter of 3.6 kilometers with an absolute magnitude of 14.53.

Naming 

This minor planet was named in honor of famous German mathematician Adam Ries (1492–1559), who wrote the first German arithmetic book in the 16th century, explaining in simple terms to the common people how to do arithmetic.

At the time, this was considered to be difficult. This minor planet was the 100th numbered discovery of astronomer Freimut Börngen. The approved naming citation was published by the Minor Planet Center on 18 August 1997 . This minor planet should not be confused with 236305 Adamriess, named after American astronomer and 2011 Nobel Prize winner Adam Riess.

References

External links 
 Asteroid Lightcurve Database (LCDB), query form (info )
 Dictionary of Minor Planet Names, Google books
 Asteroids and comets rotation curves, CdR – Observatoire de Genève, Raoul Behrend
 Discovery Circumstances: Numbered Minor Planets (5001)-(10000) – Minor Planet Center
 
 

007655
Discoveries by Freimut Börngen
Named minor planets
19911228